Tutin is a town and municipality located in the Raška District of southwestern Serbia. According to a 2011 census, the municipality of Tutin has a population of 31,155 people.

History
The settlement of Gluhavica in the territory of Tutin is likely the oldest village attested by name in the municipality. It was an iron mining center of Stefan Milutin, King of Serbia in the early 14th century. After the battle of Kosovo (1389), the Gluhavica mine was the first to be placed under direct Ottoman control in the area. A kadi of Gluhavica is attested as early as 1396.

There is no information about the foundation of the town of Tutin and its etymology is unknown. The village is mentioned for the first time in an 1868 travelogue by British writer M. Mackenzie. In 1700, after the Great Serb Migration, the Albanian Kelmendi and Kuçi and other Albanian tribes like the Shkreli of Rugova established themselves in the region of Rožaje and the neighboring town of Tutin in Serbia. The Shala, Krasniqi, and Gashi also moved into the region. Starting in the 18th century many people originating from the Hoti tribe have migrated to and live in Sandžak, mainly in the Tutin area, but also in Sjenica. Catholic Albanian groups which settled in Tutin in the early 18th century were converted to Islam in that period. Their descendants make up the large majority of the population of Tutin and the Pešter plateau.

The name of Tutin first appeared in 1868 in the work of English travelers. According to that work, Tutin had only 7 houses of which 6 belonged to the Hamzagić family and one was Serb. Until 1912, Tutin was a small settlement with 20 houses. In the 20th century, the settlement was greatly developed: public buildings, a health station, a school and shops were built. During World War II, Tutin belonged to the Italian protectorate of Albania from 1941 to 1943 and to the Albanian Kingdom from 1943 to 1944, which was a client state of Nazi Germany.

Tutin was the first municipality in Serbia to have renewable wind power. It was opened in 2011 with an installed capacity of 600 KW.

Climate
Tutin has a humid continental climate (Köppen climate classification: Dfb).

Demographics

According to the last official census done in 2011, the Municipality of Tutin has 31,155 inhabitants. Population that lives in urban areas comprises 32.4% of the municipality's total population. Depopulation is typical for villages because of the migrations to urban and other areas. Population density on the territory of the municipality is 41.99 inhabitants per square kilometer.

Ethnic groups
Most of Tutin's population are Bosniaks (90.0%), followed by Muslims and Serbs. Ethnic composition of the municipality:

Note: Most of those who in 1991 census declared themselves as ethnic Muslims, in the next census in 2002 declared themselves as Bosniaks, while the smaller number of them still declare themselves as ethnic Muslims.

Economy
The following table gives a preview of total number of registered people employed in legal entities per their core activity (as of 2018):

Notable people
 Mensur Suljović (born 1972), Austrian darts player
 Saffet Sancaklı (born 1966), Turkish footballer, politician

International relations

Twin towns – Sister cities
Tutin is twinned with:
 Mostar, Bosnia and Herzegovina
 Gaziosmanpaşa, Turkey
 Iznik, Turkey

See also
 Bosniaks
 Bosniaks of Serbia
 Raška
 Sandžak
 List of places in Serbia

References

External links

 

 
Populated places in Raška District
Sandžak
Municipalities and cities of Šumadija and Western Serbia
Albanian communities in Serbia